Moscow Sovremennik Theatre is a theatre company in Moscow founded in 1956. "Sovremennik" means "Contemporary".

History
The Sovremennik Theatre was founded by a group of young Soviet actors during the Khrushchev Thaw. Among the founders, all of whom graduated from Moscow Art Theatre School-Studio, were Oleg Yefremov, Galina Volchek, Igor Kvasha, Liliya Tolmachyova, Yevgeny Yevstigneyev and Oleg Tabakov. The debut production was Victor Rozov's play Forever Alive. The theatre's first artistic director, Oleg Yefremov, left in 1970. It was then led by Galina Volchek until her death.

Actors
 Georgi Burkov (1970−1971)
 Oleg Dahl (1968−1971, 1972−1975)
 Leonid Filatov (1985−1987)
 Valentin Gaft (1969−2019)
 Lyudmila Gurchenko (1964−1966)
 Igor Kvasha (1957−current)
 Andrey Myagkov (1965−1977)
 Marina Neyolova (1974−current)
 Viktor Pavlov (1962−1965)
 Oleg Tabakov (1957−1983)
 Anastasiya Vertinskaya (1968−1980)
 Galina Volchek (1956−2019)
 Oleg Yefremov (1956−1970)
 Yevgeny Yevstigneyev (1956−1992)
 ANNA DORENKO (1998−1998)

References

Performing groups established in 1956
Theatre companies in Russia
Theatres in Moscow